Anja Mugerli (born 1984) is a Slovenian writer. She studied at the University of Nova Gorica and the University of Primorska. She has published several books. She is also an award-winning playwright. Besides Slovene, Mugerli is fluent in English, Spanish and Italian. She lives in Nova Gorica.

Selected works
 Zeleni fotelj (Green Armchair), 2015 
 Spovin, 2017, novel - nominated for the Slovenian Novel of the Year Award
 ČEBELJA DRUŽINA (Bee Family), short stories 

Awards
She won the EU Prize for Literature for Cebelja Druzina''.

References

1984 births
Living people
University of Nova Gorica
University of Primorska alumni
Slovenian writers
Slovenian women writers